Yevgeniy Velko (born 23 February 1997) is a Belarusian professional footballer who plays for Slutsk.

References

External links 
 
 

1997 births
Living people
Sportspeople from Brest, Belarus
Belarusian footballers
Association football midfielders
FC Dinamo Minsk players
FC Luch Minsk (2012) players
FC Dnyapro Mogilev players
FC Slutsk players